Confucian historians condemned the emperor Qin Shi Huang in the Ten Crimes of Qin, a list that was compiled to highlight his tyrannical actions. The famous Han poet and statesman Jia Yi concluded his essay The Faults of Qin (:zh:过秦论) with what was to become the standard Confucian judgment of the reasons for Qin's collapse. Jia Yi's essay, admired as a masterpiece of rhetoric and reasoning, was copied into two great Han histories and has had a far-reaching influence on Chinese political thought as a classic illustration of Confucian theory. He explained the ultimate weakness of Qin as a result of its ruler's ruthless pursuit of power, the precise factor which had made it so powerful; for as Confucius had taught, the strength of a government ultimately is based on the support of the people and virtuous conduct of the ruler.

References

Confucian texts
Historiography of China
Qin dynasty
Qin Shi Huang